Fairview Heights station is an at-grade light rail station on the K Line of the Los Angeles Metro Rail system. It is located alongside Redondo Boulevard and near the intersection of Florence Avenue and West Boulevard in Inglewood but near the Hyde Park neighborhood of Los Angeles.

The station opened on October 7, 2022. Metro held a ceremonial ribbon cutting ceremony for the station on August 20, 2022.

The station incorporates artwork by the artist Kim Schoenstadt.

The Fairview Heights station will be the western trailhead of the Rail-to-Rail Route bike path.

Service

Station layout

Hours and frequency

Connections 
, the following connections are available:
Los Angeles Metro Bus: ,

Notable places nearby 
The station is within walking distance of the following notable places:

 Centinela Park, including the Aguaje de Centinela landmark
 Inglewood Park Cemetery

Fairview Heights station and nearby Downtown Inglewood station are both within walking distance of the following sporting venues:
 Hollywood Park Casino, originally part of Hollywood Park Racetrack (1938–2013), still offers off-track betting on horse races
 Kia Forum, commonly known as the Forum
 SoFi Stadium

References 

K Line (Los Angeles Metro) stations
Inglewood, California
Railway stations in the United States opened in 2022